The following lists events that happened during 2003 in South Africa.

Incumbents
 President: Thabo Mbeki.
 Deputy President: Jacob Zuma.
 Chief Justice: Arthur Chaskalson.

Cabinet 
The Cabinet, together with the President and the Deputy President, forms part of the Executive.

National Assembly

Provincial Premiers 
 Eastern Cape Province: Makhenkesi Stofile 
 Free State Province: Winkie Direko
 Gauteng Province: Mbhazima Shilowa 
 KwaZulu-Natal Province: Lionel Mtshali 
 Limpopo Province: Ngoako Ramathlodi
 Mpumalanga Province: Ndaweni Mahlangu
 North West Province: Popo Molefe 
 Northern Cape Province: Manne Dipico
 Western Cape Province: Marthinus van Schalkwyk

Events

January
 8 – Unit 2 power generator explodes at Duvha Power Station while coming back on line after maintenance. 
 17 – Jacob Zuma, Deputy President of South Africa, holds ceasefire talks with Pierre Nkurunziza, the leader of a faction of the National Council for the Defense of Democracy-Forces for the Defense of Democracy (CNDD-FDD).
 21 – Jacob Zuma holds ceasefire talks with Alain Mugabarabona, the leader of the Palipehutu-FNL and Jean-Bosco Ndayikengurukiye, the leader of the other faction of CNDD-FDD.
 24 – The Inkwazi, the South African Air Force Boeing Business Jet, develops technical problems during its inaugural flight taking President Thabo Mbeki to Paris, France, and has to turn back.
 25–26 – Jacob Zuma facilitates meetings between Pierre Buyoya, the President of Burundi and rebels Alain Mugabarabona, Jean-Bosco Ndayikengurukiye and Pierre Nkurunziza in Pretoria.
 27 – Pierre Buyoya, the President of Burundi and Pierre Nkurunziza, leader of a faction of the CNDD-FDD, sign a memorandum of understanding in Pretoria.

February
 9 Feb- 23 Mar - South Africa co-hosts the ICC Cricket World Cup. Australia are declared champions after beating India in the final.
March
 21 – The Truth and Reconciliation Commission releases its final report.

April
 1 – The defence ministers of South Africa, Ethiopia and Mozambique announce in Addis Ababa that their countries will send 3,500 peace-keeping troops under the African Union flag to Burundi within 60 days.
 1 – A South African Air Force Cheetah C fighter jet crashes near Louis Trichardt with pilot Major Andrea Serra ejecting safely.

May
 13 – Health Minister Manto Tshabalala-Msimang presents her budget speech to the National Assembly, outlining that free health care will be extended to people with disabilities.

June
 5 – A South African Air Force Oryx helicopter crash lands at Durban International Airport and the crew suffer minor injuries.
 6 – Nkosazana Dlamini-Zuma, Celso Amorim and Yashwant Sinha, foreign ministers of South Africa, Brazil and India, meet in Brasilia, Brazil and sign the Brasilia Declaration.
 PJ Powers and Sibongile Khumalo are awarded the 2002 Reconciliation Award by the Institute for Justice and Reconciliation.
 The name of the town Louis Trichardt is changed to Makhado.

July
 31 – SABC shuts down Bop TV due to financial constraints.

August
 3–6 – A National AIDS Conference is held in Durban.
 14 – South Africa signs a contract to acquire four new Super Lynx helicopters for operation from the new naval corvettes.
 28 – Three parachuted pallets, dropped by a South African Air Force Casa 212 during a training mission, are blown off course and lands in a residential suburb of Gauteng, causing minor damage.

September
 7–17 – The 5th World Parks Congress is held in Durban.

October
 2 – The first South African Air Force BAE Hawk 120 (serial no. 250) makes its maiden flight at BAE Systems’ Warton, Fylde.
 7 – South African Justice Ministry officials announce that the five policemen who were accused of killing Steve Biko in 1977 will not be prosecuted because of insufficient evidence.
 8 – Domitien Ndayizeye, President of Burundi and Pierre Nkurunziza, the leader of a faction of the CNDD-FDD, sign an agreement in Pretoria under the facilitation of Thabo Mbeki, President of South Africa and Jacob Zuma, Deputy President of South Africa, to integrate the armed forces, the police and intelligence services of Burundi.
 15–18 – President Thabo Mbeki holds bilateral talks with Atal Bihari Vajpayee, Prime Minister of India, while on a state visit to India.
 17 – The first South African Air Force BAE Hawk 120 (serial no. 250) arrives in South Africa inside an Antonov An-22.
 19 – The South African Competitions Commission finds two giant pharmaceutical companies, GlaxoSmithKline and Boehringer Ingelheim Pharmaceuticals, guilty of price fixing anti-retroviral drugs.

November
 12 – A South African Air Force Impala Mk I jet trainer crashes next to the N4 highway between Nelspruit and Komatipoort. Pilots Lieutenant Paul Martin and Lieutenant Gert Duvenhage abort an emergency landing on the highway to avoid an oncoming truck and eject, but are both killed, one of them hitting the truck.

December
 11 – The Sea Point, Cape Town home of Asher Karni, an Israeli and South African businessman who is alleged to have supplied nuclear technology to Pakistan, is raided by police.

Unknown date
 Sewsunker "Papwa" Sewgolum receives a posthumous achievement award from President Thabo Mbeki.

Births
• 8 January - Clement Molobela , Media Personality

Deaths

 5 May – Walter Sisulu, South African political activist. (b. 1912)
 31 May – Billy Wade, cricketer. (b. 1914)
 15 June – Kaiser Matanzima, 1st President of Transkei. (b. 1915)
 6 August –Larry Taylor, English actor and stuntman. (b. 1918)
 9 August – Lesley Manyathela, footballer Orlando Pirates striker. (b. 1981)
 13 September – Kenneth Walter, cricketer. (b. 1939)
 4 November – Ken Gampu, actor. (b. 1929)
 30 December – David Bale, South African-born English businessman and activist. (b. 1941)

See also
2003 in South African television

References

South Africa
Years in South Africa
History of South Africa